Bailrigg is the campus of Lancaster University, in the City of Lancaster, Lancashire, England,  south of the centre of Lancaster. The student radio station Bailrigg FM is named after the site.

History 

Bailrigg was a hamlet in the township of Scotforth and in some early deeds it was described as a manor. Its 2,880 acres were owned by Count Roger Pictavensis and his family, and afterwards the title fell to Cockersand Abbey. The settlement gave its name to a local family, Roger de Bailrigg and his descendents. In 1469 the land was granted to John Gardiner, who endowed Lancaster Royal Grammar School, and it went through numerous owners subsequently. In 1887 it was purchased by Thomas Storey, who founded the Storey Institute. He died in 1898 and the estate passed to his son Herbert Storey.

Bailrigg House

Herbert Storey had Bailrigg House, also known as Bailrigg Mansion, built between 1899 and 1902 by Woolfall and Eccles of Liverpool. The landscape around Bailrigg House was also reoriented, and additional aspects added, with some of the work done by landscape architect Thomas Hayton Mawson. In 1921, Storey moved to Wiltshire, and the estate was bought by James Travis-Clegg, who lived there until he died in 1942. In 1944, the estate was bought by Barton Townley, a local car dealer. He agreed to sell the estate to the City of Lancaster for £50,000 in 1961, and eventually did so in 1963, in order to make way for the new University of Lancaster.

University Campus
The new university buildings were designed by Gabriel Epstein and Peter Shepheard.

In January 2017, Bailrigg was chosen by the government as the site of a new garden village, with up to 5,000 new homes.

Gallery

References

Buildings and structures of Lancaster University
University and college campuses in the United Kingdom